APEC Mexico 2002 was a series of political meetings held around Mexico between the 21 member economies of the Asia-Pacific Economic Cooperation during 2002. Leaders from all member countries met from 26–27 October 2002 in Los Cabos. Counter-terrorism efforts were major topics on the agenda of APEC Mexico 2002. The APEC summit attempted to present a new opportunity for Asian investors and commercial agents to discover Mexico as a profitable frontier in the future.

Attending country representatives

Priorities 
The three priorities of the APEC summit were:

1. Implementation of policies on trade, investment and finance to promote economic growth and extract gains from the New Economy;

2. Capacity building to obtain benefits from development through the promotion of micro, small and medium sized enterprises;

3. Strengthening APEC's international relevance by encouraging greater participation of youth and women, intensifying efforts to promote the benefits of globalization and improving the functioning of APEC.

References

Los Cabos Municipality (Baja California Sur)
2002
Diplomatic conferences in Mexico
21st-century diplomatic conferences (Asia-Pacific)
2002 in international relations
2002 conferences
2002 in Mexico
October 2002 events in Mexico